The 2012 United States presidential election in Montana took place on November 6, 2012, as part of the 2012 United States presidential election in which all 50 states plus the District of Columbia participated. Montana voters chose three electors to represent them in the Electoral College via a popular vote pitting incumbent Democratic President Barack Obama and his running mate, Vice President Joe Biden, against Republican challenger and former Massachusetts Governor Mitt Romney and his running mate, Congressman Paul Ryan.

Romney carried Montana with 55.35% of the vote to Obama's 41.70%, with a 13.65% margin of victory. Montana was the second-best state performance for Libertarian candidate Gary Johnson, carrying about 3% of the vote.

Romney performed much better than John McCain had in 2008, when he narrowly won over Obama with only a 2.38% margin of victory. Romney also won over five counties that voted for Obama in 2008. Most of the counties Obama won were either majority Native American (such as Big Horn, Blaine, Glacier, and Roosevelt) or have some of Montana's most populous cities and towns, such as Missoula County (containing its namesake city, the second largest in the state and home of the University of Montana) and Silver Bow County (home to Butte and Montana Tech).
As of 2020, this remains the last time that a Republican has won Gallatin County or that a Democrat has won Hill County or Roosevelt County. Obama became the first Democrat to win the White House without carrying Cascade or Rosebud Counties since Jimmy Carter in 1976.

Obama remains the only Democrat since statehood to win two terms in the White House without carrying Montana either time.

Primaries

Democratic

Republican

 
The Republican caucuses took place on June 14 to 16, 2012 as the Montana state convention. Ten days before, the state delegates were selected by the central committee in each county 23 delegates were to have been chosen, for a total of 26 delegates to go to the national convention. Prior to selecting delegates, a non-binding primary election was held June 5, 2012. Results were announced before the Republican National Convention in August.

General election
The Republican ticket won by a margin of 13.65%

Results

By county

Counties that flipped from Democratic to Republican

 Cascade (largest city: Great Falls)
 Gallatin (largest city: Bozeman)
 Lake (largest city: Polson)
 Lewis and Clark (largest city: Helena)
 Rosebud (largest city: Colstrip)

By congressional district
Due to the state's low population, only one congressional district is allocated, the At-Large District. This district covers the entire state, and thus is equivalent to the statewide election results.

See also
 United States presidential elections in Montana
 2012 Republican Party presidential debates and forums
 2012 Republican Party presidential primaries
 Results of the 2012 Republican Party presidential primaries
 Montana Republican Party

References

External links
The Green Papers: for Montana
The Green Papers: Major state elections in chronological order

Montana
United States president
2012